Oreton is a small village in the English county of Shropshire, in the civil parish of Farlow.

Oreton is on a hill overlooking the River Rea and is some twelve miles southwest from Bridgnorth and four miles north from Cleobury Mortimer.

There is a public house - the New Inn.

References

External links 

Villages in Shropshire